This is a list of the first women lawyer(s) and judge(s) in Connecticut. It includes the year in which the women were admitted to practice law (in parentheses). Also included are women who achieved other distinctions such becoming the first in their state to graduate from law scchool or become a political figure.

Firsts in Connecticut's history

Lawyers 

 First female: Mary Hall (1882) 
First African American female: Bessye Anita Warren Bennett (1974) 
First Latino American (female) prosecutor: Rosita "Bae" Cremer (1978)
First Asian Pacific Islander female: Elizabeth Yen (1980) 
First DACA-recipient (female): Denia Perez in 2018

State judges 

 First female (justice of the peace): Alice J. O'Neill during the 1920s 
 First female (trial court/circuit court): JoAnne Kulawiz in 1972 
First female (Superior Court of Connecticut): Ellen Bree Burns (1947) in 1976 
First female (Connecticut Supreme Court): Ellen Ash Peters (1954) in 1978 
First female (Colorado Court of Appeals/Chief Judge): Antoinette Dupont 
First female (Chief Justice; Connecticut Supreme Court): Ellen Ash Peters (1954) in 1984 
First African American female: E. Curtissa R. Cofield in 1991 
First Hispanic American (female): Carmen E. Espinosa in 1992
First Asian American (female): Nina F. Elgo (1990) in 2004 (2004) 
First Portuguese American female: Maria Araújo Kahn (1989) in 2006 
First Hispanic American female (Connecticut Court of Appeals): Carmen E. Espinosa in 2011  
 First Hispanic American female (Connecticut Supreme Court): Carmen E. Espinosa in 2013 
 First Asian American (female) (Connecticut Court of Appeals): Nina F. Elgo (1990) in 2018

Federal judges 
First female (U.S. Court of Appeals for the Second Circuit): Susan L. Carney (1977): 
First female (U.S. District Court for the District of Connecticut): Ellen Bree Burns (1947) in 1978 
First female (U.S. Magistrate Judge for the District of Connecticut): Joan G. Margolis in 1985
First female (Chief Judge; U.S. District Court for the District of Connecticut): Ellen Bree Burns (1947) in 1988 
First South Asian (female) (U.S. District Court for the District of Connecticut): Sarala Nagala in 2021 
First Latino American female (U.S. District Court for the District of Connecticut): Maria Eugenia Garcia in 2022

Attorney General of Connecticut 

First female: Clarine Nardi Riddle (1974) from 1989-1991

Assistant Attorney General 

 First Asian American (female): Nina F. Elgo (1990) in 2000

United States Attorney 

First female (acting): Nora Dannehy from 2008-2010
First female: Deidre M. Daly in 2014 
First African American (female): Vanessa R. Avery in 2022

Assistant United States Attorney 

 First African American female: Cheryl Brown Wattley in 1978 
 First Latino American female: Carmen E. Espinosa in 1980 
 First Pacific Islander (female): Carolyn Ikari in 1995 
 First South Asian (female): Krishna Patel in 1999

State's Attorney 

 First African American (female): Gail Petteway Hardy in 2007

Assistant State's Attorney 

 First female: Anne C. Dranginis (1972) in 1977 
 First African American (female) to serve as a Supervisory Assistant State's Attorney: Juliett L. Crawford in 1988

Public Defender 

 First female: Ellen B. Lubell around 1977

Assistant Public Defender 

 First Latino American (female) to act as a Supervisory Assistant Public Defender: Grace Cavero Feliú in 1998

Connecticut Bar Association 

 First female (president): Marilyn Seichter from 1989-1990 
First female (executive director): Alice A. Bruno in 2012

Firsts in local history
 Vivien Hall Root: First female lawyer in Fairfield County, Connecticut (c. 1905)
Dianne Andersen (c. 1950s): First female lawyer in Danbury, Connecticut [Fairfield County, Connecticut]
Dianne Yamen: First female probate judge in Danbury, Connecticut (1990) [Fairfield County, Connecticut]
Mary Hall (1882): First female lawyer in Hartford County, Connecticut
Catherine Kligerman: First female to serve as the President of the Hartford County Bar Association, Connecticut (1990)
Eboni S. Nelson: First African American (female) to serve as the Dean of the University of Connecticut School of Law (2020)
Ellen B. Lubell: First female to serve as a Public Defender for the New Haven Judicial District (c. 1977) [New Haven County, Connecticut]

See also 

 List of first women lawyers and judges in the United States
 Timeline of women lawyers in the United States
 Women in law

Other topics of interest 

 List of first minority male lawyers and judges in the United States
 List of first minority male lawyers and judges in Connecticut

References 

Lawyers, Connecticut, first
Connecticut, first
Women, Connecticut, first
Women, Connecticut, first
Women in Connecticut
Connecticut lawyers
Lists of people from Connecticut